Conda may refer to:

 Conda, Angola, a town and municipality in Angola
 Conda Canton, in Bolivia
 Conda, Idaho, a place in the United States
 Conda (package manager), a piece of software

People with the name 
 Cesar Conda, American lobbyist
 Aleksander Čonda, Slovenian motorcyclist

See also 
 Arena Condá, a stadium in Brazil
 Konda (disambiguation)